Daniel Choquet (born 1962)  is a French neuroscientist.

Personal life and career

Daniel Choquet is the son of the physicist Yvonne Choquet-Bruhat and the mathematician Gustave Choquet. He is the grandson of the physicist Georges Bruhat. He obtained his bachelor's degree in 1979, followed by a degree in bioengineering from École centrale Paris in 1984. He obtained his P.hD. in 1988 from Pierre and Marie Curie University and studied pharmacology at the Pasteur Institute. That year, he started working for the French National Centre for Scientific Research (CNRS). From 1994 to 1996, he was a post-doctoral fellow at Duke University. The following year, in 1997, he was promoted to research director at the CNRS. He is the director of the Bordeaux Imaging Center and the Interdisciplinary Institute for Neuroscience. He was elected as a member of the French Academy of Sciences on November 30, 2010.

Research 

Choquet is a biologist, focusing on nanoscopic imaging and the organization of receptors in neurons. His early research included work on the properties of ion channels of B lymphocytes. This research work earned him the CNRS Bronze medal in 1990. During his post-doc at Duke, he discovered that cells can respond and adapt to the mechanical properties of their environment.

Since 1996, he has researched the fundamental properties of the transmission of nerve impulses in the brain and developed new nanoscale imaging techniques. He discovered that receptors move in living neurons and that these movements in and out synapses participate to synaptic plasticity, a phenomenon thought to underlie learning and memory. Choquet's current work involves attempting to understand the role of receptor movements in neurodegenerative diseases. His recent research work has earned him the 2004 CEA Prize and the 2009 CNRS Silver Medal.

Awards 

 1990: CNRS Bronze medal
 1994:	Petit-Dormoy prize of the Académie des Sciences
 1994:	Prize of the "société de secours des amis de la science"
 1997: Research prize form the Fondation pour la Recherche Médicale
 2004: Grand prix de l'Académie des Sciences, prize of the CEA
 2006:	Labeled FRM team by the "Fondation pour la Recherche Médicale"
 2007:	Laureate of the "Bauer Lectureship award", Brandeis University
 2008:	Laureate of an "ERC advanced research grant" from the European Commission
 2009:	Nominated author of the year 2008 by the French Society for Neurosciences
 2009:	CNRS Silver Medal
 2010: Elected member of the French Academy of Sciences, integrative biology section
 2011: Laureate of the "Victoires de la médecine 2011" 
 2012: Nominated "Chevalier de l'ordre des Palmes académiques"
 2013 : laureate of an "ERC advanced research grant" from the European Commission
 2014: Elected member of EMBO
 2015 : elected member of the Academia Europaea
 2016 : Nominated "chevalier de l'ordre de la légion d'honneur"
 2018 : laureate of an "ERC advanced research grant" from the European Commission
 2021 : Nominated "officier de l'ordre des Palmes académiques"

References

External links
 Biosketch en anglais
 presentation on the web site of the Bordeaux  Neuroscience Federation
 presentation at the Academy
 web site of the Interdisciplinary Institute for Neuroscience
 web site of the Bordeaux Imaging Center

1962 births
French neuroscientists
Living people
Members of the French Academy of Sciences
Pierre and Marie Curie University alumni
Research directors of the French National Centre for Scientific Research
École Centrale Paris alumni